Valentina Khokhlova (born 10 February 1949 in Lipetsk, Russia) is a Belarusian rowing coxswain. She competed in the women's coxed four at the 1988 Summer Olympics and the women's eight at the 2000 Summer Olympics and won three World Rowing Championships gold medals in the eight class.

References

1949 births
Living people
Belarusian female rowers
Olympic rowers of Belarus
Olympic rowers of the Soviet Union
Rowers at the 1988 Summer Olympics
Rowers at the 2000 Summer Olympics
World Rowing Championships medalists for the Soviet Union
Coxswains (rowing)